The Scottish Fold is a breed of domestic cat with a natural dominant gene mutation that affects cartilage throughout the body, causing the ears to "fold", bending forward and down towards the front of the head, which gives the cat what is often described as an "owl-like" appearance.

Originally called lop-eared or lops after the lop-eared rabbit, Scottish Fold became the breed's name in 1966. Depending on registries, longhaired Scottish Folds are varyingly known as Highland Fold, Scottish Fold Longhair, Longhair Fold and Coupari.

All Fold cats are affected by Osteochondrodysplasia (OCD) a developmental abnormality that affects cartilage and bone development throughout the body. This condition causes the ear fold in the breed and studies point to all Fold cats being affected by it. Fold cats therefore have malformed bone structures and can develop severe painful degenerative joint diseases at an early age.

History

Origin
The original Scottish Fold was a white barn cat named Susie, who was found at a farm near Coupar Angus in Perthshire, Scotland, in 1961. Susie's ears had an unusual fold in their middle, making her resemble an owl. When Susie had kittens, two of them were born with folded ears, and one was acquired by William Ross, a neighbouring farmer and cat-fancier. Ross registered the breed with the Governing Council of the Cat Fancy (GCCF) in the United Kingdom in 1966 and started to breed Scottish Fold kittens with the help of geneticist Pat Turner. The breeding programme produced 76 kittens in the first three years – 42 with folded ears and 34 with straight ears. The conclusion from this was that the ear mutation is due to a simple dominant gene.

Susie's only reproducing offspring was a female Fold named Snooks who was also white; a second kitten was neutered shortly after birth. Three months after Snooks' birth, Susie was killed by a car. All Scottish Fold cats share a common ancestry to Susie.

Acceptance
The breed was not accepted for showing in Europe and the GCCF withdrew registrations in 1971 due to crippling deformity of the limbs and tail in some cats and concerns about genetic difficulties and ear problems such as infection, mites, and deafness, but the Folds were exported to America and the breed continued to be established using crosses with British Shorthairs and American Shorthairs. Since the initial concerns were brought, the Fold breed has not had the mite and infection problems, though wax buildup in the ears may be greater than in other cats. The concerns about deformities may have been caused by osteochondrodysplasia, which causes abnormalities in bone and cartilage throughout the body.

Popularity
The rare distinctive physical traits of the breed, combined with their reputation as unusually loving companions, make Folds highly sought-after pets, with Fold kittens typically costing considerably more than kittens of more common breeds. Scottish folds are also popular among celebrities, one of them being American singer Taylor Swift, who owns two Scottish fold cats named Meredith Grey (the titular character of the medical drama series Grey's Anatomy), and Olivia Benson (the protagonist of the police drama series Law & Order: Special Victims Unit).

Characteristics

Ears

Scottish Fold kittens that do not develop folded ears are known as Scottish Straights. The original cats only had one fold in their ears, but due to selective breeding, breeders have increased the fold to a double or triple crease that causes the ear to lie totally flat against the head.

Body
The Scottish Fold is a medium to large sized cat, which can come in any colour, even calico. Males typically weigh , and females weigh . The Fold's entire body structure, especially the head and face, is generally rounded, and the eyes large and round. The nose is short with a gentle curve, and the cat's body is well-rounded with a padded look and medium-to-short legs. The head is domed at the top, and the neck very short. The broadly-spaced eyes give the Scottish Fold a "sweet expression". The Scottish Fold's ears are folded hence the name "Scottish Fold".

Coat
Scottish Folds can be either long- or short-haired, and they may have nearly any coat colour or combination of colours (including white). Shorthair Scottish Folds have thick and soft fur, with longhair Folds having longer and exceptionally dense fur around their upper thighs, toes, ears, and tail.

Temperament

Scottish Folds, whether with folded ears or with normal ears, are typically good-natured and placid and adjust to other animals within a household extremely well. They tend to become very attached to their human caregivers and are by nature quite affectionate. Folds also receive high marks for playfulness, grooming and intelligence. Scottish Folds like to be outdoors and enjoy outdoor games and activities. Loneliness is something they heavily dislike.

Habits
Folds are also known for sleeping on their backs. Scottish Folds typically have soft voices and display a complex repertoire of meows and purrs not found in better-known breeds. Folds are also known for sitting with their legs stretched out and their paws on their belly. This position is called the "Buddha Position".

Genetics
An early study suggested that the fold is inherited as an autosomal dominant trait. A later study suggested an incomplete dominance. A cat with folded ears may have either one (heterozygous) or two copies (homozygous) of the dominant fold gene (Fd). A cat with normal ears should have two copies of the normal gene (fd).

Mating a homozygous fold with any cat will produce all folds, but because homozygous folds are prone to severe health issues, breeding for them is generally considered unethical. A homozygous to normal mating will produce only heterozygous folds but presumably in ethical breeding programs, there will be no homozygous cats available to breed from.

The only generally accepted breeding gives a 50% chance of producing heterozygous folds and 50% chance of producing progeny with normal genes.

There is suspicion that some non-fold litters are genetically heterozygous folds but because of very low expression of the gene, appear to be straight-eared. Such kittens may develop folded ears initially which then straighten back out. Because of this there are suggestions by some breeders to avoid mating Folds with straight-eared Scottish Folds but only use British Shorthairs (BSH) as outcross. If Scottish Shorthairs are to be used, they should be test mated to a BSH to make sure that they are not genetically folds. If such apparent straight-eared cats are mated with a fold, there is a 75% chance of folds (25% homozygous folds, 50% heterozygous folds) and 25% chance of straight ears.

In 2016 the genetic mutation responsible for the folded ears and the osteochondrodysplasia (OCD) was identified. It was found in a gene encoding a calcium permeable ion channel, transient receptor potential cation channel, subfamily V, member 4 (TRPV4). The mutation is a V342F substitution (c.1024G>T) in the fifth ankyrin repeat within the N-terminal cytoplasmic domain. It was also found in a human patient with metatropic dysplasia.

Health
The typical lifespan of a Scottish Fold is 15 years.

Scottish folds are susceptible to polycystic kidney disease (PKD) and cardiomyopathy.
Scottish folds are also prone to degenerative joint disease (a type of arthritis), most commonly affecting the tail, ankles, and knees which can result in reduced range of motion.

Osteochondrodysplasia
Osteochondrodysplasia (OCD) is a developmental abnormality that affects cartilage and bone development throughout the body.  This condition causes the ear fold in the breed and, in studies conducted so far, all Fold cats are affected by it. Homozygous Folds are affected by malformed bone structures and develop severe painful degenerative joint diseases at an early age. Some breeders claim that this condition also affects heterozygous Folds, but usually to a much lesser extent and at a later age. Some will be asymptomatic.. There's no scientific proof to this claim.

In a study of Rorden  four radiologists, blinded to the ear phenotype, assessed radiographs of 22 Scottish Fold/Straight cats. All cats were genotyped showing the heterozygous mutation in all folded ear cats but not in straight cats. Each reviewer gave on average the folded ear cats a worse "severity score", however the images showed much milder signs than previously published. The authors state that the severity of OCD in heterozygous cats is very variable and subtle. This could be due to other modifier genes or nurture (climate, diet, exercise). So it was shown that the least affected folded ear cat was given identical or less score than the highest rated straight ear cat.

In a case study of Takanosu  two Scottish Fold mixed cats with severe exostosis in the hind leg are described. Interestingly both cats were homozygous for the TrpV4 mutation, assuming the parental cats had both the c.1024G>T mutation in the TrpV4 gene. This reinforces the hypothesis that mostly homozygous Scottish Folds are severely affected. On the other hand it is concerning that still Scottish Fold cats are bred with each other,  also breeding with other cat strains with skeletal abnormalities (Munchkin, American Curl) should be avoided.

While ethical breeders breed Fold/non-Fold and not Fold/Fold (in the same way Munchkins are bred) to avoid producing homozygous Folds, because heterozygous Folds can also develop progressive arthritis of varying severity, some researchers recommend abandoning the breeding of Fold cats entirely. For this reason, the breed is not accepted by either the Governing Council of the Cat Fancy or the Fédération Internationale Féline (FIFe).
CFA breeders have stated that using only Fold to non-Fold breeding has eliminated problems with stiff tails, shortened tails and bone lesions. In the FIFe discussion, the representative for British breeders claimed that they were not seeing the problem in their cats, and that the study which showed that all heterozygous also have the condition had a small sample size. An offer of free X-ray radiography was presented to 300 breeders to find a Fold cat with healthy hind legs, but it was never taken up. A similar offer was set up by the World Cat Federation together with researcher Leslie Lyons but there was also no response. FiFe stated that they will not consider recognizing Scottish Folds if breeders will not allow their breed to be scrutinized.

In a report on Scottish Folds, the Breed Standards Advisory Council (BSAC) for New Zealand Cat Fancy (NZCF) states that "Breeders may not have appreciated the strength of the evidence that heterozygous cats can and do develop [feline] OCD." While research shows that all heterozygous Folds develop OCD, and anecdotal evidence shows that heterozygous Folds can and do develop OCD, they do not show whether mildly affected parents are more likely to have mildly affected offspring. They also do not show what percentage of Folds are severely affected. The report states that there is not enough information to justify banning Scottish Fold matings, but enough to justify a level of concern. Recommended guidelines include:

 A requirement for periodic vet examination of breeding cats for any evidence of lameness, stiffness, or pain—breeding cats with signs to be desexed. 
 A requirement for periodic X-rays of breeding cats and comparison of X-ray evidence with clinical symptoms, possibly leading to a requirement that cats with a specified degree of skeletal change to be desexed.
 Requesting the agreement of pet owners to be periodically contacted by the NZCF or by a researcher, to  provide reports about the health of their cat. 
 All information to be reported/submitted to the BSAC to allow information to be collated to give an overall picture of FOCD in Scottish Folds in NZ.
 Requirements to be in place for a minimum of 5 years to enable tracking of the health of Folds over time.

The Cat Who Went to Paris
The short novel The Cat Who Went to Paris by Peter Gethers features "the most famous Scottish Fold" according to Grace Sutton of The Cat Fanciers' Association. The book documents the life of Gethers and his Fold, Norton, from their first meeting to Norton's eventual death and Gethers' experiences after the loss.

See also
 
 
 American Curl, a breed with ears curving up and back, somewhat opposite to the Scottish Fold
 Cat body type genetic mutations
 List of Scottish breeds
 Maru (cat)

References
Reference 13 needs a complete link to PubMed

Dai J, Kim OH, Cho TJ, Schmidt-Rimpler M, Tonoki H, Takikawa K,et a. Novel and recurrent TRPV4 mutations and their association with distinct phenotypes within the TRPV4 dysplasia family. J Med Genet. 2010 Oct;47(10):704-9. doi: 10.1136/jmg.2009.075358. Epub 2010 Jun 24. PMID: 20577006.

External links

 CFA breed Profile
 Osteochondrodysplasia in Scottish Fold

 
Cat breeds
Cat breeds originating in Scotland
Cat breeds and types with bent ears